Pierre Laujon (13 January 1727 – 13 July 1811) was a French playwright and chansonnier. He was uncle to the playwright Pierre-Yves Barré.

Works 
Theatre
1745: La Fille, la veuve et la femme, parodie nouvelle des Fêtes de Thalie, Théâtre italien de Paris, 21 August
1747: Daphnis et Chloé, pastorale, Paris, Académie royale de musique, 28 September
1747–1748: Recueil des comédies et ballets, représentés sur le théâtre des petits appartements pendant l'hiver de 1747 à 1748
1750: La Journée galante, ballet héroïque en 3 actes, représenté devant le Roi, sur le théâtre des petits appartemens à Versailles, 25 February
1754: Zéphire et Fleurette, one-act parody of Zelindor by François-Augustin de Paradis de Moncrif, Théâtre italien de Paris, 23 March
1756: L'Amour impromptu, parodie de l'acte d'Eglé dans les Talents lyriques, Paris, Opéra-Comique, 10 July
1762: Armide, parody of the opera Armide, in 4 acts, Théâtre italien de Paris, 11 January
1763: Ismène et Isménias, ou la Fête de Jupiter, three-act opera, presented in front of their Majesties, in Choisy, Monday 13 June
1765: Silvie, three-act opara with a prologue, presented in front of their Majesties in Fontainebleau, 17 October
1771: L'Amoureux de quinze ans, ou la Double fête, comedy in 3 acts and in prose, mingled with ariettes, Théâtre italien de Paris, 18 April
1776: Æglé, ballet-héroïque in 1 act, presented in front of their Majesties, in Fontainebleau, 4 November
1777: Matroco, drame burlesque, in 4 acts and in verse, mingled with ariettes and comédies en vaudevilles, presented in front of their Majesties, Théâtre italien de Paris
1782: Le Poète supposé, ou les Préparatifs de fête, comedy in 3 acts and in prose, mingled with ariettes and comédies en vaudevilles, Théâtre italien de Paris, 25 April
1790: Le Couvent, ou les Fruits du caractère et de l'éducation, comedy in 1 act and in prose, Paris, Théâtre de la Nation, 16 April
1806: Le Juif bienfaisant, ou les Rapprochements difficiles, comedy in five acts and in prose, imitated from English, given in Rouen June
Varia
1776: Les À propos de la folie ou Chansons grotesques, grivoises et annonces de parade, 1776
1800: Notice sur les Dîners du Caveau, published in Les Dîners du Vaudeville, Frimaire An V.
1811: Œuvres choisies de P. Laujon, contenant ses pièces représentées sur nos principaux théâtres, ses fêtes publiques ou particulières, ses chansons et autres opuscules, avec des anecdotes, remarques et notices relatives à ces divers genres.

References 
 Gustave Vapereau, Dictionnaire universel des littératures, Paris, Hachette, 1876, p. 1205

External links 
 Biography on the Académie française site
 His plays and their productions on CESAR

Writers from Paris
1727 births
1811 deaths
French chansonniers
18th-century French poets
18th-century French male writers
18th-century French dramatists and playwrights
19th-century French dramatists and playwrights
Members of the Académie Française
Burials at Père Lachaise Cemetery